In Buddhism, a sotāpanna (Pali), śrotāpanna (Sanskrit; , , Burmese: သောတာပန်, Tibetan: རྒྱུན་ཞུགས་, Wylie: rgyun zhugs), "stream-enterer", "stream-winner", or "stream-entrant" is a person who has seen the Dharma and thereby has dropped the first three fetters (Pāli: samyojana, Sanskrit: saṃyojana) that bind a being to a possible rebirth in one of the three lower realms (animals, hungry ghosts and beings suffering in and from hellish states), namely self-view (sakkāya-ditthi), clinging to rites and rituals (sīlabbata-parāmāsa), and skeptical indecision (Vicikitsa).

The word sotāpanna literally means "one who entered (āpanna) the stream (sota), stream-enterer", after a metaphor which calls the noble eightfold path a stream which leads to a vast ocean, nibbāna. Entering the stream (sotāpatti) is the first of the four stages of enlightenment.

Attainment

The first moment of the attainment is termed the path of stream-entry (sotāpatti-magga), which cuts through the first three fetters. The person who experiences it is called a stream-winner (sotāpanna).

The sotāpanna is said to attain an intuitive grasp of the dharma, this wisdom being called right view (sammā diṭṭhi) and has unshakable confidence in the Buddha, Dharma, and Sangha. The Buddha, Dharma, and Sangha, sometimes taken to be the triple refuge, are at other times listed as being objects of recollection. In general though, confirmed confidence in the Buddha, Dharma and Sangha, respectively, is considered to be one of the four limbs of stream-winning (sotāpannassa angāni). The sotapanna is said to have "opened the eye of the Dhamma" (dhammacakkhu), because they have realized that whatever arises will cease (impermanence). Their conviction in the true dharma would be unshakable.

They have had their first glimpse of the unconditioned element, the asankhata, in which they see the goal, in the moment of the fruition of their path (magga-phala). Whereas the stream-entrant has seen nibbāna and, thus has verified confidence in it, the arahant can drink fully of its waters, so to speak, to use a simile from the Kosambi Sutta (SN 12.68) — of a "well", encountered along a desert road.
 The sotapanna "may state this about himself: 'Hell is ended; animal wombs are ended; the state of the hungry shades is ended; states of deprivation, destitution, the bad bourns are ended! I am a stream-winner, steadfast, never again destined for states of woe, headed for self-awakening!'".

However, the remaining three paths, namely: once-return (sakadāgāmin), non-return (anāgāmin), and sainthood (arahatta) become 'destined' (sammatta niyāma) for the stream-entrant.  Their enlightenment as a disciple (ariya-sāvaka) becomes inevitable within seven lives transmigrating among gods and humans; if they are diligent (appamatta, appamāda) in the practice of the Teacher's (satthāra) message, they may fully awaken within their present life. They have very little future suffering to undergo.

The early Buddhist texts (e.g. the Ratana Sutta) say that a stream-entrant will no longer be born in the animal womb, or hell realms; nor as a hungry ghost. The pathways to unfortunate rebirth destinations (duggati) have been closed to them.

According to the theory of Theravada Buddhism，in the period of 5000 years after the parinirvana of Buddha，we can still attain Sotāpanna or even Arhat through practicing Satipatthana，and Satipatthana is the only way out.

Three fetters
In the Pali Canon, the qualities of a sotāpanna are described as:

The three fetters which the sotāpanna eradicates are:
 Self-view — The view of substance, or that what is compounded (sankhata) could be eternal in the five aggregates (form, feelings, perception, intentions, cognizance), and thus possessed or owned as 'I', 'me', or 'mine'. A sotāpanna doesn't actually have a view about self (sakkāya-ditthi), as that doctrine is proclaimed to be a subtle form of clinging.
 Clinging to rites and rituals - Eradication of the view that one becomes pure simply through performing rituals (animal sacrifices, ablutions, chanting, etc.) or adhering to rigid moralism or relying on a god for non-causal delivery (issara nimmāna). Rites and rituals now function more to obscure, than to support the right view of the sotāpanna's now opened dharma eye. The sotāpanna realizes that deliverance can be won only through the practice of the Noble Eightfold Path. It is the elimination of the notion that there are shortcuts to perfecting all virtues.
 Skeptical doubt - Doubt about the Buddha, his teaching (Dharma), and his community (Sangha) is eradicated because the sotāpanna personally experiences the true nature of reality through insight, and this insight confirms the accuracy of the Buddha's teaching. Seeing removes doubt, because the sight is a form of vision (dassana), that allows one to know (ñāṇa).

Defilements
According to the Pali Commentary, six types of defilement would be eventually abandoned by a sotāpanna, and no major transgressions:
Envy
Jealousy
Hypocrisy
Fraud
Denigration
Domineering

Rebirth
A sotāpanna will be safe from falling into the states of misery (they will not be born as an animal, ghost, or hell being). Their lust, hatred and delusion will not be strong enough to cause rebirth in the lower realms. A sotāpanna will have to be reborn at most only seven more times in the human or heavenly worlds before attaining nibbāna. It is not necessary for a sotāpanna to be reborn seven more times before attaining nibbāna, as an ardent practitioner may progress to the higher stages in the same life in which he/she reaches the Sotāpanna level by making an aspiration and persistent effort to reach the final goal of nibbāna.

According to Buddha, there are three types of sotapannas classifiable according to their possible rebirths:
 "If a man, after the disappearance of the 3 fetters (the samyojana: personality-belief, skeptical doubt, attachment to rules and rituals), has entered the stream (to Nibbāna), he is no more subject to rebirth in lower worlds, is firmly established, destined to full enlightenment. After having passed amongst the heavenly and human beings only seven times more through the round of rebirths, he puts an end to suffering. Such a man is called 'one with 7 births at the utmost' (sattakkhattu-parama).
 "If a man, after the disappearance of the 3 fetters.... is destined to full enlightenment, he, after having passed among noble families two or three times through the round of rebirths, puts an end to suffering. Such a man is called 'one passing from one noble family to another' (kolankola).
 "If a man, after the disappearance of the 3 fetters.... is destined to full enlightenment, he, after having only once more returned to human existence, puts an end to suffering. Such a man is called 'one germinating only once more' (eka-bījī).

Six actions that are not committed
A sotāpanna will not commit six wrong actions:
Murdering one's own mother.
Murdering one's own father.
Murdering an arahant.
Maliciously injuring the Buddha to the point of drawing blood.
Deliberately creating a schism in the monastic community.
Taking another Teacher [besides Buddha].

Textual references

Suttas
The Buddha spoke favorably about the sotapanna on many occasions, and even though it is (only) the first of ariya sangha members, he or she is welcomed by all other sangha-members for he or she practices for the benefit and welfare of many. In the literature, the arya sangha is described as "the four" when taken as pairs, and as "the eight" when taken as individual types. This refers to the four supra-mundane fruits (attainments: "phala") and the corresponding four supra-mundane paths (of those practicing to attain those fruits: "magga").

This is called "the recollection of the Sangha" (sanghanussati). It can also be interpreted as, "They are the Blessed One's disciples, who have practiced well, who have practiced directly, who have practiced insight-fully, those who practice with integrity (to share what they have learned with others). They give occasion for incomparable goodness to arise in the world because gifts to them bear great fruit and benefit to the giver.
The fifty-fifth Samyutta of the Samyutta Nikaya is called the Sotāpatti-saṃyutta, and concerns sotapannas and their attainment. In the discourse-numbers (of that chapter) 1–4, 6–9, 11–14, 16–20, 22–36, 39–49, 51, 53, 54, sotapannas are praised as Sangha members by and to: the sick, lay followers, people on their deathbed, bhikkhunis, bhikkhus, and devas, and end up becoming the well-being and benefit of many.

Dhammapada
From Dhammapada verse 178:

Sole dominion over the earth,
going to heaven,
lordship over all worlds:
the fruit of stream-entry
excels them.

Chán
See also Sudden Enlightenment

According to Mahāyāna Master Bhikshu Hsuan Hua's Commentary on the Vajra Sutra, 

Venerable Hsuan Hua continues,

See also
Four stages of enlightenment

Notes

External links
Thanissaro Bhikkhu (2006). Stream Entry (Part 1: The Way to Stream-entry). Retrieved 28 Sep 2007 from Access to Insight.
Thanissaro Bhikkhu (2004). Stream Entry (Part 2: Stream-entry and After). Retrieved 28 Sep 2007 from Access to Insight.
Samyutta Nikaya , translation from Mahindarama Temple, Penang, Malaysia. 
 Jeffrey S. Brooks, On Self-Ordination, taking the title Sotapanna (Stream Winner), beginning a new Vehicle of Buddhism and Using the Buddha's terminology for hierarchy within that new vehicle

Buddhist titles
Nondualism
Buddhist stages of enlightenment